John Henry (November 1750December 16, 1798) was the eighth Governor of Maryland and member of the United States Senate. He was born at his family's estate (Weston), located near Vienna in Dorchester County.

Early life
John Henry was born in November 1750. He was the son of Dorothy Rider and Col. John Henry and the grandson of Rev. John Henry, a Presbyterian minister who came to America in the early 1700s.  His grandmother, Mary King, was the daughter of an Irish baronet.  His mother was a descendant of one of the early settlers of Dorchester County.

Henry attended West Nottingham Academy in Cecil County, Maryland and graduated from the College of New Jersey (later Princeton University) in 1769; he then studied law at the Middle Temple (one of the Inns of Court where English barristers are trained) in London. He returned to the United States in 1775 and practiced law in Dorchester County.

Career
He was a member of the Episcopal Church and the United States Democratic-Republican Party. Originally, he was a member of the Federalist Party.

Henry served as a member of Maryland House of Delegates from 1777 to 1780 and a member of the Maryland State Senate from 1780 to 1790. During that time he was chosen as a delegate to the Continental Congress from Maryland from 1778 to 1780 and from 1785 to 1786; during his service, he was a member of the committee that prepared the ordinance for the government of the Northwest Territory. He was elected as an inaugural Senator from Maryland, serving 1789 as a Federalist till his resignation on December 10, 1797, to assume the Governorship.

In the 1796 election, Henry received two electoral votes for President of the United States. He served as Governor of Maryland from 1797 to 1798. In this capacity, he exchanged letters with then Vice-President, Thomas Jefferson.

Personal life
On March 6, 1787, Henry was married to Margaret Campbell (1769–1789), the daughter of John and Elizabeth (née Goldsborough) Campbell of Caroline County.  Her sister married Philip Francis and was the grandmother of Gov. Philip Francis Thomas.  Margaret died, aged 20, shortly after the birth of their second son. Their two sons were:

 John Campbell Henry (1787–1857), who married Mary Nevett Steele (1789–1873), the daughter of James Steele (1760–1816) and a sister of U.S. Rep. John Nevett Steele and Isaac Nevett Steele, a Baltimore lawyer.
 Francis Jenkins Henry (b. 1789), who died unmarried soon after becoming of age.

He died in Dorchester County, at Weston, the same estate where he had been born. Henry is buried in Christ Episcopal Church Cemetery in Cambridge.

Descendants
Henry was a grandfather to John and Mary's eight children, John Francis Henry (1813–1847), Dr. James Winfield Henry (1815–1889), Francis Jenkins Henry (1816–1902), Catherine Henry Lloyd (1818–1886), Daniel Maynadier Henry (1823–1899), Isabella Elizabeth Henry Steele (1825–1912), Mary Henry Goldsborough (1828–1911), Rider Henry (1828–1900), and Charlotte Augusta Page Henry Goldsborough (1834–1908).

External links
Notes

Sources
Henry’s Congressional biography
John Henry – Delmarva Heritage Series

1750 births
1798 deaths
People from Dorchester County, Maryland
People of colonial Maryland
American people of Scottish descent
American Episcopalians
Continental Congressmen from Maryland
Pro-Administration Party United States senators from Maryland
Federalist Party United States senators from Maryland
Maryland Democratic-Republicans
Maryland state senators
Members of the Maryland House of Delegates
Governors of Maryland
Democratic-Republican Party state governors of the United States
Candidates in the 1796 United States presidential election
Princeton University alumni